Vrengen is a village in Arendal municipality in Agder county, Norway.  The village is located in the Bjorbekk area of Arendal, along the Norwegian County Road 407, just north of the mouth of the river Nidelva. The Bjorbekk Church lies just northwest of Vrengen and the village of Asdal lies just to the south.

References

Villages in Agder
Arendal